George Spencer, 4th Duke of Marlborough,  (26 January 1739 – 29 January 1817), styled Marquess of Blandford until 1758, was a British courtier, nobleman, and politician from the Spencer family. He served as Lord Chamberlain between 1762 and 1763 and as Lord Privy Seal between 1763 and 1765. He is the great-great-great grandfather of Sir Winston Churchill.

Background and education
Styled by the courtesy title Marquess of Blandford from birth, he was the eldest son of Charles Spencer, 3rd Duke of Marlborough, and the Honourable Elizabeth Trevor, daughter of Thomas Trevor, 2nd Baron Trevor. His siblings were Charles, Diana and Elizabeth.

Personal traits and characteristics
According to George III, who mentioned it to Fanny Burney, the Duke suffered from severe red-green colourblindness. As he was unable to tell scarlet from green, Fanny, therefore, remarked that this was unlucky for someone in possession of so sumptuous a home as Blenheim Palace.

Career
Marlborough entered the Coldstream Guards in 1755 as an Ensign, becoming a Captain with the 20th Regiment of Foot the following year. After inheriting the dukedom in 1758, Marlborough took his seat in the House of Lords in 1760, becoming Lord-Lieutenant of Oxfordshire in that same year. The following year, he bore the sceptre with the cross at the coronation of George III. In 1762, he was made Lord Chamberlain as well as a Privy Counsellor, and after a year resigned this appointment to become Lord Privy Seal, a post he held until 1765. An amateur astronomer, he built a private observatory at his residence, Blenheim Palace. He kept up a lively scientific correspondence with Hans Count von Brühl, another non-academic astronomer.

The Duke was made a Knight of the Garter in 1768, and was elected to the Royal Society in 1786.

Family
Marlborough married Lady Caroline Russell (1743–1811), daughter of John Russell, 4th Duke of Bedford, in 1762, by whom he had eight children:

Lady Caroline Spencer (1763–1813), married Henry Agar-Ellis, 2nd Viscount Clifden and had issue, including George Agar-Ellis, 1st Baron Dover.
Lady Elizabeth Spencer (1764–1812), married her cousin John Spencer (a grandson of the 3rd Duke of Marlborough) and had issue.
George Spencer-Churchill, 5th Duke of Marlborough (1766–1840)
Lady Charlotte Spencer (1769–1802), married Rev. Edward Nares and had issue.
Lord Henry John Spencer (1770–1795)
Lady Anne Spencer (1773–1865), married Cropley Ashley-Cooper, 6th Earl of Shaftesbury and had issue.
Lady Amelia Spencer (1774–1829), married Henry Pytches Boyce.
Lord Francis Almeric Spencer (1779–1845), created Baron Churchill in 1815.

The Duchess of Marlborough died at Blenheim Palace in November 1811, aged 68. The Duke of Marlborough died at Blenheim Palace in January 1817, aged 78, and was buried there.

Gallery

References

The Collected Correspondence of Baron Franz von Zach, Volume 3 (British Letters), 2008. Edited by Clifford J. Cunningham. Star Lab Press.

|-

1739 births
1817 deaths
Coldstream Guards officers
George Spencer, 4th Duke of Marlborough
104
Fellows of the Royal Society
Knights of the Garter
Lancashire Fusiliers officers
Lord-Lieutenants of Oxfordshire
Lords Privy Seal
People educated at Eton College